Cowboy and the Senorita  is a 1944 American Western film directed by Joseph Kane and starring Roy Rogers. The film marked the first appearance together of Rogers and his future wife, Dale Evans.

Plot
Roy and his sidekick Teddy Bear are mistaken for the kidnappers of a runaway teenager. After escaping from a posse the two find the teenager, Chip who explains their innocence and has her sister Ysobel and her soon to be husband the rich Craig Allen give the pair jobs. Chip tells Roy she is sure her late father had riches hidden away that the unscrupulous Craig Allen tries to take for himself. The film opens and closes with musical numbers.

Cast
Roy Rogers as Roy Rogers
Trigger as Trigger
Mary Lee as Chip Williams
Dale Evans as Ysobel Martinez
John Hubbard as Craig Allen
Guinn "Big Boy" Williams as "Teddy" Bear
Fuzzy Knight as Fuzzy
Dorothy Christy as Lulubelle
Lucien Littlefield as Judge Loomis
Hal Taliaferro as Matt Ferguson
Jack Kirk as Sheriff Gilbert
Capella as Specialty dancer
Patricia as Specialty dancer
Jane Beebe as Specialty dancer
Ben Rochelle as Specialty dancer
Bob Nolan as Bob Nolan (Leader, Sons of the Pioneers)
Sons of the Pioneers as Musicians, Ranch hands

Soundtrack
"Cowboy and the Senorita" (Music by Phil Ohman, lyrics by Ned Washington)
"What'll I Use for Money?" (Music by Phil Ohman, lyrics by Ned Washington)
"The Enchilada Man" (Music by Phil Ohman, lyrics by Ned Washington)
"Bunk House Bugle Boy" (Written by Tim Spencer and Bob Nolan
"Besame mucho" (Written by Consuelo Velázquez)
"She Wore a Yellow Ribbon" (Written by George A. Norton)

See also
List of American films of 1944

External links

1944 films
1944 Western (genre) films
1940s English-language films
American black-and-white films
Republic Pictures films
American Western (genre) films
Films directed by Joseph Kane
1940s American films